August Geiger (6 May 1920 – 29 September 1943) was a German Luftwaffe military aviator during World War II, a night fighter ace credited with 53 aerial victories making him the nineteenth most successful night fighter pilot in the history of aerial warfare. All of his victories were claimed over the Western Front in Defense of the Reich missions, the majority at night against the Royal Air Force's (RAF) Bomber Command and one daytime claim over a United States Army Air Forces (USAAF) Boeing B-17 Flying Fortress.

Born in Überlingen, Geiger grew up in the Weimar Republic and Nazi Germany. Following graduation from school, he joined the military service in 1939 and was trained to fly Messerschmitt Bf 110 heavy fighter. In mid-1941, he transferred to Nachtjagdgeschwader 1 (NJG 1—1st Night Fighter Wing) where he became a night fighter pilot and claimed his first aerial victory on the night of 25/26 June 1942. Geiger was appointed squadron leader of 7. Staffel (7th squadron) of NJG 1 in January 1943. Following his 26th aerial victory, he was awarded the Knight's Cross of the Iron Cross on 22 May 1943. Geiger was killed in action when he was shot down by an RAF night fighter on the night of 29 September 1943. He was posthumously bestowed with the Knight's Cross of the Iron Cross with Oak Leaves.

Early life and career
Geiger was born on 6 May 1920 in Überlingen, near Lake Constance, which was part of the Republic of Baden during the Weimar Republic. He was the son of a typographer. After graduation from school and receipt of his Abitur (university entry qualification), Geiger joined the Luftwaffe on 15 November 1939 as a Fahnenjunker (cadet). Following flight training, he was promoted to Leutnant (second lieutenant) on 1 April 1941.

World War II
World War II in Europe had begun on Friday, 1 September 1939, when German forces invaded Poland. Following the 1939 aerial Battle of the Heligoland Bight, Royal Air Force (RAF) attacks shifted to the cover of darkness, initiating the Defence of the Reich campaign. By mid-1940, Generalmajor (Brigadier General) Josef Kammhuber had established a night air defense system dubbed the Kammhuber Line. It consisted of a series of control sectors equipped with radars and searchlights and an associated night fighter. Each sector named a Himmelbett (canopy bed) would direct the night fighter into visual range with target bombers. In 1941, the Luftwaffe started equipping night fighters with airborne radar such as the Lichtenstein radar. This airborne radar did not come into general use until early 1942.

Night fighter career

In mid-1941, Geiger was posted as to 9. Staffel (9th squadron) of Nachtjagdgeschwader 1 (NJG 1—1st Night Fighter Wing). This Staffel was subordinated to III. Gruppe (3rd group) of NJG 1 under the command of Hauptmann Wolfgang Thimmig. The aircraft shot down was Halifax L9521 from the No. XXXV (Madras Presidency) Squadron on its mission to bomb the Leuna works.

Now flying with 8. That night, RAF bombers objective was Emden and lost 8 out of 191 aircraft, including Stirling R9352 from No. 15 Squadron to Geiger's attack. On 25/26 June, RAF Bomber Command sent over 1,000 bomber to Bremen. Luftwaffe night fighter pilots claimed 48 aerial victories, including three by Geiger. He was credited with shooting down the Vickers Wellington bomber R1078 from No. 11 Operational Training Unit near Rheine, the Armstrong Whitworth Whitley bomber AD689 from No. 10 Operational Training Unit near Lingen, and the Short Stirling bomber N3754 from No. 7 Squadron.

On 29/30 July, RAF Bomber Command targeted Hamburg. The RAF lost 30 aircraft in the attack, including the Wellington bomber Z1570 from the Royal New Zealand Air Force (RNZAF) No. 75 Squadron shot down by Geiger near Neuenhaus. The following night, Bomber Command sent 291 bombers to Saarbrücken. In defense of this attack, Geiger shot down the Whitley bomber Z9230 from No. 138 Squadron west-northwest of Rijssen. He received the Honor Goblet of the Luftwaffe on 19 October 1942.

Squadron leader
Geiger was appointed Staffelkapitän (squadron leader) of the 7. Staffel of NJG 1 on 5 January 1943. Geiger claimed his first aerial victory with 7. Staffel on 1 March 1943. That night, the RAF Bomber Command attacked Berlin with 302 aircraft. Geiger's victim may have been Halifax W7877 from No. 35 Squadron. This Halifax, with an almost intact H2S ground scanning radar system, allowed the Germans to analyze the radar. This led to the development of the FuG 350 (FuG—Funkgerät) Naxos radar detector, which allowed the night fighters to home on to the H2S emitting signals.

On the night of 29/30 March 1943, Geiger became an "ace-in-a-day", in this instance an "ace-in-a-night", taking his total to 20 aerial victories. That night, he claimed one Halifax, two Wellington and three Avro Lancaster bombers. On his first mission of the night at 22:52, he shot down Wellington bomber HE182 from the 431 (Iroquois) Squadron near Ahaus. He then claimed Wellington bomber HE385 from No. 196 Squadron at 23:15 near Barchem. On his second mission, Geiger claimed Halifax bomber BE244 from No. 51 Squadron returning from Berlin and was intercepted near Vorden. He then shot down Lancaster bomber ED596 from No. 106 Squadron which came down near Delden at 04:27. His last aerial victory of the night was over Lancaster bomber W4327 from the Royal Australian Air Force (RAAF) No. 460 Squadron which came down near Kloosterhaar in Twenterand.

Geiger was promoted to Oberleutnant (first lieutenant) on 1 April. On 1 May, Geiger downed Halifax DT471 of 405 Maritime Patrol Squadron flown by H P Atkinson. Atkinson, and one other crewmember died. The RAF bombed Duisburg on the night of 12/13 May, losing 34 of the 572 bombers making the attack. Defending against this attack, Geiger claimed three aerial victories. He shot down a Halifax bomber from No. 35 Squadron and another one from No. 77 Squadron, plus the Wellington bomber HE321 from the Royal Canadian Air Force (RCAF) 428 Ghost Squadron. Geiger was awarded with the Knight's Cross of the Iron Cross on 22 May 1943, the nomination had been submitted for 26 aerial victories claimed earlier. The presentation was made by Generalmajor Kammhuber.

On the night of 23/24 May, Geiger shot down two Lancaster bombers. One of which was Lancaster bomber W4984 from the RAAF No. 460 Squadron shot down near Emmen. Bomber Command had sent 829 bombers to Dortmund of which 38 did not return. On the night of 12/13 June, Bochum was attacked by Bomber Command and 24 of 503 bombers were shot down. Geiger was credited with destroying Lancaster ED584 from No. 49 Squadron near Raalte. On 1 July, he was promoted to Hauptmann (captain) and received the German Cross in Gold on 31 August 1943. That night Geiger claimed his 44th victory over Stirling EH961 from No. 196 Squadron. Sergeant J. Griffiths and two other members of the seven man crew were killed. Crew member and gunner Sergeant C P Pierce was among the youngest fatalities in the RCAF in 1943, aged 18.

On 29 September 1943, Geiger was shot down by the Bristol Beaufighter VI of Wing commander Bob Braham of No. 141 Squadron RAF over the Zuiderzee, Netherlands. Geiger and his radio operator Feldwebel Dieter Koch managed to bail out of their Messerschmitt Bf 110 G-4 (Werknummer 5477—factory number), but both drowned. On 2 March 1944, Geiger was posthumously awarded the Knight's Cross of the Iron Cross with Oak Leaves, the 416th officer or soldier of the Wehrmacht so honored. He was buried at the German war cemetery Ysselsteyn (block M, row 4, grave 83) in the Netherlands.

Summary of career

Aerial victory claims
According to Spick, Geiger was credited with 53 nocturnal aerial victories claimed in an unknown number of combat missions. Foreman, Parry and Mathews, authors of Luftwaffe Night Fighter Claims 1939 – 1945, researched the German Federal Archives and found records for 51 nocturnal victory claims. Mathews and Foreman also published Luftwaffe Aces — Biographies and Victory Claims, listing Geiger with 48 claims, plus two further unconfirmed claims.

Awards
 Honour Goblet of the Luftwaffe on 19 October 1942 as Leutnant and pilot
 German Cross in Gold on 31 August 1943 as Hauptmann in the 1./Nachtjagdgeschwader 1
 Knight's Cross of the Iron Cross with Oak Leaves
 Knight's Cross on 22 May 1943 as Oberleutnant and Staffelkapitän of the 7./Nachtjagdgeschwader 1
 416th Oak Leaves on 2 March 1944 as Hauptmann and Gruppenkommandeur of the III./Nachtjagdgeschwader 1

Promotions

Notes

References

Citations

Bibliography

 
 
 
 
 
 
 
 
 
 
 
 
 

 
 
 
 
 
 
 
 
 
 
 

1920 births
1943 deaths
People from Überlingen
Luftwaffe pilots
German World War II flying aces
Luftwaffe  personnel killed in World War II
Recipients of the Gold German Cross
Recipients of the Knight's Cross of the Iron Cross with Oak Leaves
Aviators killed by being shot down
Burials at Ysselsteyn German war cemetery
People from the Republic of Baden
Military personnel from Baden-Württemberg